Curveball is a 2020 German political satire film drama directed by Johannes Naber. It is based on true events leading up to the Iraq War of 2003. The film premiered in the Berlinale Special section at the 70th Berlin International Film Festival.

Cast
 Sebastian Blomberg as Wolf
 Dar Salim as Rafid Alwan
 Virginia Kull as Leslie
 Michael Wittenborn as Retzlaff
 Thorsten Merten as Schatz
 Franziska Brandmeier as Meg, Wolf's daughter

References

External links
 

2020 films
2020 comedy films
German comedy films
2020s German-language films
German political satire films
2020s German films